Ildemar Alcântara Cardoso  (born 7 November 1982) is a Brazilian mixed martial artist currently competing in the light heavyweight division. A professional competitor since 2005, he has formerly competed in the UFC and is the younger brother of current UFC fighter Iuri Alcântara.

Mixed martial arts career

Jungle Fight
With the departure of Marcelo Guimarães, who was champion of the middleweight division in Jungle Fight, the organization decided to hold a tournament to crown a new champion. He fought against Eder Baiano Jones. Alcântara won via split decision and advanced in the tournament, then faced Ederson Cristian Macedo and won via armbar submission. At Jungle Fight 47, he was crowned champion by defeating Itamar Rosa winning via TKO.

Ultimate Fighting Championship
Alcântara made his UFC debut replacing Roger Hollett to face Wagner Prado in a light heavyweight bout on 19 January 2013 at UFC on FX: Belfort vs. Bisping. He won the bout via kneebar submission in the second round and earned Submission of the Night honors.

Alcântara was expected to make his welterweight debut against Jason High at UFC on Fuel TV 10. However, High was pulled from the bout in late April in favor of a matchup on the same card against Erick Silva after Silva's original opponent was scratched from the event. Alcântara instead faced promotional newcomer Leandro Silva. He won the fight via unanimous decision.

Alcântara faced promotional newcomer Igor Araújo on 9 October 2013 at UFC Fight Night 29. Araújo defeated Alcântara via unanimous decision.

Alcântara faced promotional newcomer Albert Tumenov on 15 February 2014 at UFC Fight Night 36. He won the fight via split decision.
 
Alcântara was expected to face Santiago Ponzinibbio on 5 July 2014 at UFC 175.  However, Ponzinibbio pulled out of the bout citing a knee injury and was replaced by Kenny Robertson. Alcântara lost the fight via unanimous decision.

Alcântara moved back up to middleweight to face Richardson Moreira on 31 January 2014 at UFC 183. He won the fight by split decision.

Alcântara faced Kevin Casey on 15 July 2015 at UFC Fight Night 71. He lost the fight by unanimous decision, and was subsequently released from the promotion.

Championships and accomplishments
Jungle Fight
Jungle Fight Middleweight Championship (One time)
Ultimate Fighting Championship
Submission of the Night (One time) vs. Wagner Prado

Mixed martial arts record

|-
| Loss
| align=center|26–16
| Viktor Pešta
| TKO (punches)
| Oktagon 20
| 
| align=center| 1
| align=center| 4:06
| Brno, Czech Republic
|
|-
| Loss
| align=center| 26–15
| Jailton Almeida
| Submission (arm-triangle choke)
| Thunder Fight 23
| 
| align=center| 1
| align=center| 4:49
| São Bernardo do Campo, Brazil
|
|-
| Loss
| align=center| 26–14
| Laurynas Urbonavicius
| Decision (unanimous)
| ARES FC 1
| 
| align=center| 3
| align=center| 5:00
| Dakar, Senegal
| 
|-
| Win
| align=center| 26–13
| Tyago Costa
| Submission (triangle choke)
| South America Fighters Combat 1: Marajo vs. Borges
| 
| align=center| 1
| align=center| 1:10
| Pará, Brazil
| 
|-
| Win
| align=center| 25–13
| Maico Machado
| Submission (north-south choke)
|  Super Fight Brazil 1
| 
| align=center| 2
| align=center| 1:24
| Piauí, Brazil
| 
|-
| Win
| align=center| 24–13
| Divino Gontijo
| TKO (punches)
| Champions Fight Combat 14
| 
| align=center| 1
| align=center| 0:17
| Maranhão, Brazil
| 
|-
| Win
| align=center| 23–13
| Normando Cabral de Andrade
| Submission (anaconda choke)
| World Kombat Challenge 48: WKC Apu Thai 2
| 
| align=center| 1
| align=center| 0:40
| Castanhal, Brazil
| 
|-
| Loss
| align=center| 22–13
| Magomed Ismailov
| TKO (punches)
| Fight Nights Global 85: Alikhanov vs. Kopylov
| 
| align=center| 1
| align=center| 3:41
| Moscow, Russia
|
|-
| Win
| align=center| 22–12
| Artur Alibulatov
| Decision (split)
| ProFC 64: Tibilov vs. Shvets
| 
| align=center| 3
| align=center| 5:00
| Rostov-on-Don, Russia
| 
|-
| Loss
| align=center| 21–12
| Alexey Efremov
| TKO (elbows)
| World Fighting Championship Akhmat 42
| 
| align=center| 3
| align=center| 0:19
| Moscow, Russia
| 
|-
| Loss
| align=center| 21–11
| Beslan Ushukov
| Decision (majority) 
| World Fighting Championship Akhmat 38
| 
| align=center| 3
| align=center| 5:00 
| Grozny, Chechnya, Russia 
|
|-
| Loss
| align=center| 21–10
| Markus Perez Echeimberg
| Decision (unanimous) 
| Arzalet Fighting Globe Championship
| 
| align=center| 3
| align=center| 5:00 
| São Paulo, Brazil
|
|-
| Loss
| align=center| 21–9
| Henrique da Silva
| TKO (punches) 
| The King of Jungle Championship 2
| 
| align=center| 2
| align=center| 4:55 
| Belém, Brazil
| 
|-
| Loss
| align=center| 21–8
| Kevin Casey
| Decision (unanimous) 
| UFC Fight Night: Mir vs. Duffee
| 
| align=center| 3
| align=center| 5:00 
| San Diego, California, United States
| 
|-
| Win
| align=center| 21–7
| Richardson Moreira
| Decision (split)
| UFC 183
| 
| align=center| 3
| align=center| 5:00
| Las Vegas, Nevada, United States
| 
|-
| Loss
| align=center| 20–7
| Kenny Robertson
| Decision (unanimous)
| UFC 175
|  
| align=center| 3
| align=center| 5:00
| Las Vegas, Nevada, United States
| 
|-
| Win
| align=center| 20–6
| Albert Tumenov
| Decision (split)
| UFC Fight Night: Machida vs. Mousasi
| 
| align=center| 3
| align=center| 5:00
| Jaraguá do Sul, Brazil
| 
|-
| Loss
| align=center| 19–6
| Igor Araújo
| Decision (unanimous)
| UFC Fight Night: Maia vs. Shields
| 
| align=center| 3
| align=center| 5:00
| Barueri, Brazil
| 
|-
| Win
| align=center| 19–5
| Leandro Silva
| Decision (unanimous)
| UFC on Fuel TV: Nogueira vs. Werdum
| 
| align=center| 3
| align=center| 5:00
| Fortaleza, Brazil
| 
|-
| Win
| align=center| 18–5
| Wagner Prado
| Submission (kneebar)
| UFC on FX: Belfort vs. Bisping
| 
| align=center| 2
| align=center| 2:39
| São Paulo, Brazil
| 
|-
|-
| Win
| align=center| 17–5
| Itamar Rosa
| TKO (punches)
| Jungle Fight 47: Jungle Belt
| 
| align=center| 1
| align=center| 1:07
| Porto Alegre, Brazil
| 
|-
| Win
| align=center| 16–5
| Ederson Cristian 
| Submission (armbar)
| Jungle Fight 44
| 
| align=center| 1
| align=center| 1:32
| Rio de Janeiro, Brazil
| 
|-
| Win
| align=center| 15–5
| Eder Jones
| Decision (split)
| Jungle Fight 41
| 
| align=center| 3
| align=center| 5:00
| São Paulo, Brazil
| 
|-
| Win
| align=center| 14–5
| Edilberto de Oliveira
| KO (punches)
| Jungle Fight 38
| 
| align=center| 1
| align=center| 3:02
| Belém, Brazil
| 
|-
| Win
| align=center| 13–5
| Geovane Francisco
| TKO (knee and punches)
| Jungle Fight 35
| 
| align=center| 1
| align=center| 2:14
| Rio de Janeiro, Brazil
| 
|-
| Win
| align=center| 12–5
| Willians Santos
| TKO (doctor stoppage)
| Jungle Fight 33
| 
| align=center| 1
| align=center| 2:04
| Rio de Janeiro, Brazil
| 
|-
| Win
| align=center| 11–5
| Richard Smith
| Submission (rear naked choke)
| Jungle Fight 30
| 
| align=center| 1
| align=center| 2:39
| Belém, Brazil
| 
|-
| Loss
| align=center| 10–5
| Marcelo Guimarães
| Decision (unanimous)
| Jungle Fight 28
| 
| align=center| 3
| align=center| 5:00
| Rio de Janeiro, Brazil
| 
|-
| Win
| align=center| 10–4
| Jackson Mora
| TKO (punches)
| Jungle Fight 24
| 
| align=center| 1
| align=center| 4:37
| Rio de Janeiro, Brazil
| 
|-
| Win
| align=center| 9–4
| Jacob Quintana
| TKO (knee to the body)
| Jungle Fight 23
| 
| align=center| 1
| align=center| 1:23
| Belém, Brazil
| 
|-
| Win
| align=center| 8–4
| Potcho Potcho
| TKO (punches)
| Iron Man Championship 7
| 
| align=center| 2
| align=center| 2:15
| Belém, Brazil
| 
|-
| Win
| align=center| 7–4
| Antonio Mendes
| Decision (unanimous)
| Amazon Fight 4
| 
| align=center| 3
| align=center| 5:00
| Belém, Brazil
| 
|-
| Loss
| align=center| 6–4
| Bruno Silva
| TKO (leg kick)
| Iron Man Championship 4
| 
| align=center| 2
| align=center| 0:40
| Belém, Brazil
| 
|-
| Win
| align=center| 6–3
| Rogério Gama
| TKO (punches)
| Belem Open Fight 2
| 
| align=center| 1
| align=center| 3:11
| Belém, Brazil
| 
|-
| Win
| align=center| 5–3
| Beto Silva
| KO (punches)
| Super Fight
| 
| align=center| 2
| align=center| 3:17
| São Luís, Brazil
| 
|-
| Loss
| align=center| 4–3
| Geronimo dos Santos
| TKO (punches)
| Hiro Belém
| 
| align=center| 2
| align=center| N/A
| Belém, Brazil
| Heavyweight bout.
|-
| Win
| align=center| 4–2
| Brian Maulany
| Submission (armbar)
| Cage Fight Event: Rumble in the Jungle
| 
| align=center| 1
| align=center| 2:28
| Paramaribo, Suriname
| 
|-
| Win
| align=center| 3–2
| Junior Sumo
| TKO (punches)
| Round Fight 2
| 
| align=center| 1
| align=center| 2:20
| Belém, Brazil
| 
|-
| Win
| align=center| 2–2
| Maurilio de Souza 
| Submission (kneebar)
| Ceará Vale Tudo Meeting
| 
| align=center| 3
| align=center| 2:31
| Fortaleza, Brazil
| Middleweight debut.
|-
| Loss
| align=center| 1–2
| Fábio Maldonado
| Decision (unanimous)
| Predador FC 4: Kamae
| 
| align=center| 3
| align=center| 5:00
| Brazil
| 
|-
| Loss
| align=center| 1–1
| Luís Santos
| Decision (unanimous)
| Mega Combat Vale Tudo
| 
| align=center| 3
| align=center| 5:00
| Belém, Brazil
| 
|-
| Win
| align=center| 1–0
| Luís Santos
| Submission (triangle choke)
| Iron Man Vale Tudo 7
| 
| align=center| 2
| align=center| 4:51
| Macapa, Brazil
|

See also
 List of current UFC fighters
 List of male mixed martial artists

References

External links
 
 

1982 births
Living people
Brazilian male mixed martial artists
Light heavyweight mixed martial artists
Middleweight mixed martial artists
Welterweight mixed martial artists
Mixed martial artists utilizing Brazilian jiu-jitsu
Brazilian practitioners of Brazilian jiu-jitsu
People awarded a black belt in Brazilian jiu-jitsu
Ultimate Fighting Championship male fighters
Sportspeople from Pará